Harold Joseph Wallis is a retired American center fielder who spent five seasons in Major League Baseball with the Chicago Cubs and Oakland Athletics. He was nicknamed Tarzan because of his penchant for cliff diving.

A native of East St. Louis, Illinois, Wallis attended McCluer High School and Southern Illinois University Carbondale. In 1971 and 1972, he played collegiate summer baseball with the Chatham A's of the Cape Cod Baseball League. He was selected by the Cubs in the sixth round of the 1973 MLB Draft.

Wallis broke up Tom Seaver's fifth attempt at his first-ever no-hitter with a two-out single to right field in the ninth inning of the Cubs' eleven-inning 1–0 win over the New York Mets at Wrigley Field on September 24, 1975.

Wallis was dealt twice at the trade deadline on June 15, . The Cubs first traded him to the Cleveland Indians for Mike Vail. The Indians then sent him to the Oakland Athletics for Gary Alexander an hour after the first transaction.  Wallis finished his major league career with Oakland the following season.

References

External links

Major League Baseball outfielders
Chicago Cubs players
Oakland Athletics players
Quincy Cubs players
Midland Cubs players
Key West Conchs players
Wichita Aeros players
Southern Illinois Salukis baseball players
Chatham Anglers players
Baseball players from Illinois
1953 births
Living people
All-American college baseball players
People from East St. Louis, Illinois